Dolicharthria lubricalis is a moth in the family Crambidae. It is found in Ecuador.

References

Moths described in 1905
Spilomelinae
Moths of South America